Mountbatten MRT station is an underground Mass Rapid Transit (MRT) station on the Circle line, located on the boundary of Kallang and Geylang, Singapore.

Serving the Mountbatten subzone, the area and the station is named after British Admiral Lord Louis Mountbatten, the Supreme Allied Commander of the South East Asia Command who accepted the Japanese surrender of Singapore during the Second World War.

Built at the junction of Mountbatten Road, Old Airport Road and Stadium Boulevard, Mountbatten station provides MRT access to residents of the Old Kallang Airport Estate and the numerous sports facilities at Kallang Sports Complex, including Kallang Field, Kallang Tennis Centre and Kallang Netball Centre.

Mountbatten station is within walking distances to Stadium MRT station and Dakota MRT station.

History
On 26 September 2003, construction started at Mountbatten MRT station with road realignment being done at Old Airport Road/Mountbatten Road junction.

Before the station was built, it was named Old Airport Road. As there are two stations surrounding the Old Airport Road, it was renamed to Mountbatten. Mountbatten was selected after Louis Mountbatten, 1st Earl Mountbatten of Burma, the Supreme Allied Commander (Southeast Asia) who accepted the Japanese surrender of Singapore during the Second World War.

The station was opened on 17 April 2010 along with the rest of Stage 1 & 2 of the Circle line.

The contractor in charge of building this station was Nishimatsu-Lum Chang joint venture, the same joint venture that was in charge of the Nicoll Highway station.

Geography

The alignment of the underground Kallang–Paya Lebar Expressway intersects with the alignment of the railway tunnels of the Circle line between Mountbatten and Stadium. It posed a construction challenge as both were constructed at the same time from 2003 to 2006.

The distance between Dakota MRT station and this station is one of the shortest between any two stations on the Circle line, taking less than a minute to travel between the two stations. Both stations are located on Old Airport Road, hence the short distance.

See also 

 Mountbatten, Singapore

References

External links
 

Railway stations in Singapore opened in 2010
Kallang
Geylang
Mass Rapid Transit (Singapore) stations